Killone Abbey (Irish: Mainistir Chill Eoin), situated on the banks of Killone Lake some 3 miles south of Ennis, County Clare, was an abbey of Canonesses Regular founded in 1190 by Donal Mor O'Brien, King of Thomond and Munster and dedicated to Saint John.

The ruins of the abbey, accessible through land used for grazing cattle, are located in the grounds of Newhall House, and include substantial remains of the abbey church together with a crypt. A narrow (and somewhat restrictive) stone stairway leads between the altar and the east window to a ledge atop the remains of the south wall of the church, where an overview of the grounds may be seen with care (there being no safety features incorporated).

There is currently no access as of Oct 18, 2021. The gate is closed with a notice of no trespassing and a warning of a bull in the field.

The property is in private ownership but cared for by the OPW. Permission should be sought from the land owners for entry to the property.

See also
 List of abbeys and priories in Ireland (County Clare)

References

External links
 Ruins of Killone Abbey

Augustinian monasteries in the Republic of Ireland
Buildings and structures in County Clare
Monasteries of Canonesses Regular
Ruins in the Republic of Ireland
1190 establishments in Europe
Religious organizations established in the 1190s
Religion in County Clare
Christian monasteries established in the 12th century
National Monuments in County Clare
12th-century establishments in Ireland